Noyonmoni (English: Noyon and Moni) is a 1976 Bangladeshi film starring Farooque and Bobita opposite him. She garnered Bangladesh National Film Award for Best Actress for her performance in the film. It also stars Rowshan Jamil and Anwara.

Cast 
 Bobita – Moni
 Faruk (actor) – Noyon
 Anwar Hossain (actor) 
 A.T.M. Shamsuzzaman
 Rowshan Jamil
 Syed Hasan Imam
 Anwara Begum

Music
All songs were composed by Satya Saha with lyrics written by Gazi Mazharul Anwar.

"Chul Dhoirona Khopa Khule Jabe" - Sabina Yasmin
"Ami Kothay Thaki Re" - Sabina Yasmin, Syed Abdul Hadi 
"Nani Go Nani" - Runa Laila

Awards 
Bangladesh National Film Awards
Best Actress – Bobita
Best Supporting Actress – Rowshan Jamil
Best Screenplay – Amjad Hossain

References

1976 films
Bengali-language Bangladeshi films
Films scored by Satya Saha
1970s Bengali-language films